Cynegetis impunctata is a species of ladybird native to continental Europe. In Germany it is known as the grass ladybird, unspotted ladybird or ochre ladybird.

Description
The adult beetles are about 3 to 4.5 mm long, strongly domed and ochre-brown in colour. 
There are usually no spots, but some specimens have spots or may be darker in colour.

Habitat
The species lives in damp meadows and woodlands.

Diet
Adults and larvae are vegetarian and polyphagous, on grasses such as couch-grass (Elymus repens), false oat-grass (Arrhenatherum elatius) and reed canary-grass (Phalaris arundinacea).

Distribution
It is found in Austria, Belgium, non-alpine Germany, Norway, Poland, Sweden and less frequently in other countries. As of 2012 it is not reported from the British Isles.

Literature
 Harde, Severa: Der Kosmos Käferführer, Die mitteleuropäischen Käfer, Franckh-Kosmos Verlags-GmbH & Co, Stuttgart 2000,

References

External links

www.insektenbox.de
Sammlung Zoologisches Institut St. Petersburg

Coccinellidae
Beetles described in 1767
Taxa named by Carl Linnaeus